Wayward Guide is an American comedy-horror web television series created by Corey Lubowich, Brian Rosenthal, and Joey Richter. It follows twin podcasting duo, Artemis (Mary Kate Wiles) and Paul Schue-Horyn (Steve Zaragoza), who investigate the fictional town of Connor Creek. The show also features an ensemble including Sean Astin, Darren Criss, Carlos Valdes, A. J. Holmes, Ashley Clements, Titus Makin, Cassie Silva, Dylan Saunders, Joanna Sotomura, Jon Cozart, Lauren Lopez, Nick Lang, and Clayton Snyder.

Along with quarter-hour episodes being released to YouTube, the show also hosts an in-universe podcast hosted by Wiles and Zaragoza. The series' first episode premiered on October 12, 2020 at a drive-in hosted by Tin Can Brothers. The first episode was released on YouTube on October 13, 2020.

Premise 
Wayward Guide follows the adventures of twin podcasting-team Artemis and Paul Schue-Horyn as they investigate a mystery in the mining town of Connor Creek. But what starts as a corruption investigation gets a lot hairier when it’s revealed that the oddballs of this small town are harboring a dark and furry secret: Werewolves.

Cast

Main 

 Mary Kate Wiles as Artemis Schue-Horyn
 Steve Zaragoza as Paul Schue-Horyn

Recurring 

 Joanna Sotomura as Madison Reynolds
Nick Lang as Aubrey Dockweiler
Carlos Valdes as Dr. Henry Edwards
Dylan Saunders as Desmond Brewer
Lauren Lopez as Agnes Florentine
Tara Perry as Olivia Tompkins / Riley Kirkland
Corey Dorris as Quinn Cassidy
Curt Mega as Cliff Irons
Joey Richter as Crispin Lynch
Gavyn Pickens as Helen Unger
Cassie Silva as Truman Hensley
Sean Persaud as Jeremiah Stillwater
Ashley Clements as Mary Jo Walker
Sinead Persaud as Rita Waldeburg
Whitney Avalon as Rocky Irons
 Ryan Simpkins as Jewel Irons
Sean Astin as Lesly Stone
Gabe Greenspan as Ellis Walker
A. J. Holmes as Sybilus Silver II
Clayton Snyder as Vern Marrow
Brian Rosenthal as Wallis Gale
Daniel Strauss as Barney Fletcher
Titus Makin Jr. as Silas Torsen
Jon Cozart as Donny Meadows
Brendan Bradley as Odie Doty
Paul Komoroski as Garmin Patrick Saget

Guest 

 Amrita Dhaliwal as Prism
Ed Powell as Ed Puppetman
Darren Criss as Ryan Reynolds
Jackie Emerson as Rebecca
Spencer Devlin Howard as America's Favorite Podcast Host
Sarah Grace Hart as The Mayor's Handler
 Diane Lopez-Richter as The Mayor

Episodes

Production

Development 
A teaser-trailer for the series and podcast was released on Tin Can Brothers' YouTube channel on September 22, 2020. Team Starkid, a sister channel of the Tin Can Brothers, released a second announcement video for the series on September 30, 2020.

Casting 
In the Tin Can Brother's announcement video, the full cast was announced. Darren Criss, Lauren Lopez, Joey Richter, and Dylan Saunders were seen during the video.

Filming 
Principal Photography began in Los Angeles, California in summer 2017.

Release 
The first four episodes premiered at a drive-in hosted by Tin Can Brothers on October 12, 2020.

The first episode of the series was uploaded to YouTube on October 13, 2020. The video was viewed by 15K watchers on the premiere date. The first part of the podcast series was released on October 16, 2020.

References 

Comedy horror web series
Werewolves
2020 YouTube videos